Päwesin is a municipality in the Potsdam-Mittelmark district, in Brandenburg, Germany.

Overview
There are about 600 residents and the town is 800 years old.

The landscape and nature have made this a popular destination for hikers and bicyclists. The area is popular for fishing, sailing, surfing and rowing.

Advena Hotels Bollmannsruh is the only hotel in the town.

Demography

References

Localities in Potsdam-Mittelmark